is a train station of West Japan Railway Company (JR West) in Yamatotakada, Nara, Japan. Although the station is on the Sakurai Line as rail infrastructure, it has been served by the Man-yō Mahoroba Line since 2010 in terms of passenger train services. The station is also served by the Wakayama Line. There is a transfer to Yamato-Takada Station on the Osaka Line of Kintetsu Railway.

Lines
Takada Station is served by the following JR West lines:
  Wakayama Line

Layout

Platforms

See also
 List of railway stations in Japan

External links
 Official website 

Railway stations in Japan opened in 1891
Railway stations in Nara Prefecture